Eudaphisia albonotata is a species of beetle in the family Cerambycidae. It was previously identified as the only species in the genus Eudaphisia. It was described by Pic in 1926.

References

Saperdini
Beetles described in 1926